The following highways are numbered 62A:

United States
 Nebraska Link 62A
 New York State Route 62A (former)

See also
List of highways numbered 62